No Place Like Home on Christmas is a studio album by American country singer-songwriter Bill Anderson. It was released on October 15, 2002, via Varèse Sarabande. The project was co-produced by both Anderson and Mike Toppins. It was Anderson's second album of holiday music released during his career. The album consisted of 12 tracks, all of which were new recordings or re-recordings.

Background, content and release
No Place Like Home on Christmas was recorded at the Chicken Trax Production Studio in Nashville, Tennessee. The album was co-produced by Anderson and Mike Toppins. It was his second album of Christmas music released during his career. Anderson's first was 1969's Christmas. Some of the tracks from that album were re-recorded again for Anderson's 2002 release.

The album consisted of 12 tracks. Half of the album's tracks were written by Anderson, including the title track, which was co-composed with Steve Wariner. The remaining tracks are cover versions of holiday and Christmas songs. Among the covers is Anderson's own "Po' Folks Christmas," which he first recorded in the 1960s. Additional cover songs include "Silver Bells" and "Blue Christmas".

No Place Like Home on Christmas was released on October 15, 2002, via Varèse Sarabande. It was offered as a compact disc upon its original release. It was later releases to digital retailers in the 2010s. Like his previous releases, No Place Like Home on Christmas failed to make appearances on any Billboard album charts, most notably the Top Country Albums chart.

Track listing

Personnel
All credits are adapted from Allmusic and the liner notes of No Place Like Home on Christmas.

Musical personnel
 Bill Anderson – lead vocals
 Donna Hammitt – steel guitar
 Jan Howard – background vocals
 Robert Payne – drums, percussion
 Julianna Raye – background vocals
 Lester Earl Singer – acoustic guitar, banjo, dobro, electric guitar
 Eddie Stubbs – fiddle
 Mike Toppins – acoustic guitar, background vocals, dobro, electric guitar, gut string guitar, mandolin, steel guitar
 Todd Wright – autoharp, hammer dulcimer

Technical personnel
 Bill Anderson – producer
 Valorie Cole – make-up
 Bill Pitzonka – art direction, design
 Mike Toppins – engineering, mixing, producer

Release history

References

2002 albums
Albums produced by Bill Anderson (singer)
Bill Anderson (singer) albums
Christmas albums by American artists
Country Christmas albums
Varèse Sarabande albums